The Tank Museum (previously The Bovington Tank Museum) is a collection of armoured fighting vehicles at Bovington Camp in Dorset, South West England. The collection traces the history of the tank. With almost 300 vehicles on exhibition from 26 countries it is the largest collection of tanks and the third largest collection of armoured vehicles in the world. It includes Tiger 131, the only working example of a German Tiger I tank, and a British First World War Mark I, the world's oldest surviving combat tank. It is the museum of the Royal Tank Regiment and the Royal Armoured Corps and is a registered charity.

History
The writer Rudyard Kipling visited Bovington in 1923 and, after viewing the damaged tanks that had been salvaged at the end of the First World War, recommended a museum should be set up. Accordingly, a shed was established to house the collection but was not opened to the general public until 1947.

George Forty, who was appointed director of the museum in 1982, expanded and modernized the collection. He retired in 1993 after which he was appointed an OBE. The museum established its own YouTube channel to teach about the tanks in January 2010. David Fletcher, who had been an historian at the museum since 1982, retired in 2012 and was also appointed an MBE "for his services to the history of armoured warfare".

Exhibition halls

World War I Hall (Tank Men) 
As well as containing the majority of the museum's World War I tanks this hall tells the story of men who crewed the first tanks between 1916 and 1918.
Featured tanks: Mark I tank, IV, V (one of the few World War I tanks still in working order), IX & Mark VIII "Liberty" tanks.

Inter War Hall (War Horse to Horsepower) 
This hall now explores the rise of the tank and the role of the cavalry on the Western Front.
Featured tanks: Vickers A1E1 Independent, Peerless armoured car & Vickers Light tank, Mark II.

World War II Hall 

This hall displays the biggest section, with tanks from most nations involved in that conflict.
Featured tanks: Panzer I, III, IV, Stug III, Tiger II, Jagdpanzer 38(t), Jagdpanther, Jagdtiger, Sd.Kfz. 251, Somua S35, Comet I, Matilda Mk I, A38 Valiant, Ram Cruiser Mk II, M24 Chaffee, M4 Sherman, 17pdr SP Achilles, M48 Patton, M26 Pershing, T17E1 Staghound, Hamilcar glider, DUKW, SU-76, T-26, KV-1, L3/33 LF, M13/40, Tortoise, Black Prince.

Battlegroup Afghanistan 

This hall contains the Battlegroup Afghanistan exhibition. The men of the Royal Armoured Corps were involved in some of the fiercest fighting since the Second World War.
Featured tanks: Conqueror, Chieftain (which is accessible), Challenger 1 and TOG2.

Tank Factory 
This hall explores the design & technology that goes into making tanks and AFVs. There is a mock production line of Centurions, as well as prototype and experimental vehicles.
Featured tanks: a T-55 with sections cut out enabling visitors to see inside, Swedish Strv 103, prototype FV101 Scorpion and various Ferret armoured cars, along with the first M4 Sherman supplied to the British in World War II, and an A13 Covenanter.

The Tank Story Hall 
This hall holds some of the most important tanks and AFVs in history, with a supporting collection housed in a multimedia exhibition. It follows the story of the tank, from its invention in 1915 through the 20th century and into the future.
Featured tanks: Little Willie (the forerunner of British tanks), Whippet, Renault FT, Char B1, Panzer II, Tiger 131 (a Tiger I captured in Tunisia in April 1943 and fully restored to running condition by the workshops at Bovington, this is the only Tiger I left that is capable of running under its own power; it was used in the film Fury), M3 Grant, T-34, Panther, DD Sherman, Churchill Mk VII, Sherman Firefly, M48 Patton, T-72, T-62 and Challenger 2.

The Vehicle Conservation Centre 

The Vehicle Conservation Centre provides cover for more of the collection and puts on view vehicles that had previously not been seen by the public.
Featured tanks: Charioteer, M41 Bulldog, M103, M60 Patton, T-54, Cold War and Iraqi T-55s, BMP-1, AMX-30, Type 69, Infanterikanonvagn 91, A33 Excelsior, T14 and SU-100.

Film

The museum's collection includes Tiger 131, the only surviving Tiger I tank in operable condition, which appeared in the 2014 film Fury, and the replica Mark IV tank built for the film War Horse.

See also
Tank museums 
Norfolk Tank Museum - United Kingdom
Kubinka Tank Museum – Russia
Musée des Blindés – France
Military Museum Lešany – Czech Republic
Deutsches Panzermuseum – Germany
Yad La-Shiryon – Latrun, Israel
Parola Tank Museum – Finland
Australian Armour and Artillery Museum – Australia
Nationaal Militair Museum – Soesterberg, The Netherlands
Ontario Regiment Museum - Ontario, Canada
Royal Tank Museum – Amman, Jordan
American Heritage Museum – Massachusetts, United States
Other
United States Army Ordnance Museum - Virginia, US
Polish Army Museum – large collection of Soviet, Western and Polish AFVs
Heartland Museum of Military Vehicles - Nebraska, US
Base Borden Military Museum - Ontario, Canada
Lists of armoured fighting vehicles
Tank classification

Notes

References

External links

Tank Museum website
Tank100 blog commemorating the centenary of the First World War. 
Tiger Collection blog
Rio de Janeiro's military vehicle modeling association – photographs inside the museum
The Tank Museum Multimedia

1947 establishments in England
Museums established in 1947
Military and war museums in England
Army museums in England
World War I museums in the United Kingdom
Museums in Dorset
Transport museums in England
Tank museums
World War II museums in the United Kingdom
Charities based in England